Toungo is a town in the Tansila Department of Banwa Province in western Burkina Faso. As of 2005 the town had a population of 1,350.

References

Populated places in the Boucle du Mouhoun Region
Banwa Province